The Battle of LaFourche Crossing (also spelled Lafourche Crossing) was a battle in 
Lafourche Parish, Louisiana, United States and fought on June 20–21, 1863, during the American Civil War as part of a campaign known as Taylor's Operations in West Louisiana.

Background
Confederate Major General Richard Taylor sent an expedition under Colonel James P. Major to break Union supply lines, disrupt military activities and force an enemy withdrawal from Brashear City and Port Hudson. Major set out from Washington, Louisiana, on Bayou Teche, heading south and east. While marching, his men conducted raids on Union forces, boats and plantations and in the process recaptured liberated slaves and captured animals and supplies.

Battle

Brigadier General William H. Emory, commanding the Union defenses of New Orleans, assigned Lieutenant Colonel Albert Stickney to command in Brashear City and to stem the Confederate raid if possible. Emory informed Stickney of Major's descent on LaFourche Crossing and ordered him to send troops. Feeling that no threat to Brashear City existed, Stickney, himself, led troops off to LaFourche Crossing, arriving on the morning of June 20. That afternoon, Stickney's scouts reported that the enemy was advancing rapidly.

Confederate forces began driving in Stickney's pickets around 5:00 p.m.. Southern cavalry then advanced, but was driven back. After Union troops fired a few rounds, the Confederates withdrew in the direction of Thibodaux. In the late afternoon of June 21, the Confederates engaged the Union pickets, and fighting continued for more than an hour before the Rebels retired. At about 6:30 p.m., the Confederates reappeared in force, started an artillery duel, and charged the Union lines at 7:00 p.m. An hour later, the Confederates disengaged and retired toward Thibodaux. The Union held the field. Despite the defeat, Major's raiders continued on to Brashear City.

References

 CWSAC Report Update - Louisiana

LaFourche Crossing
LaFourche Crossing
LaFourche Crossing
LaFourche Crossing
Lafourche Parish, Louisiana
1863 in Louisiana
June 1863 events